600 (six hundred) is the natural number following 599 and preceding 601.

Mathematical properties
Six hundred is a composite number, an abundant number, a pronic number and a Harshad number.

Credit and cars
 In the United States, a credit score of 600 or below is considered poor, limiting available credit at a normal interest rate.
 NASCAR runs 600 advertised miles in the Coca-Cola 600, its longest race.
 The Fiat 600 is a car, the SEAT 600 its Spanish version.

Integers from 601 to 699

600s
 601 = prime number, centered pentagonal number
 602 = 2 × 7 × 43, nontotient, number of cubes of edge length 1 required to make a hollow cube of edge length 11, area code for Phoenix, AZ along with 480 and 623
 603 = 32 × 67, Harshad number, Riordan number, area code for New Hampshire
 604 = 22 × 151, nontotient, totient sum for first 44 integers, area code for southwestern British Columbia (Lower Mainland, Fraser Valley, Sunshine Coast and Sea to Sky)
 605 = 5 × 112, Harshad number, sum of the nontriangular numbers between the two successive triangular numbers 55 and 66, number of non-isomorphic set-systems of weight 9.
 606 = 2 × 3 × 101, sphenic number, sum of six consecutive primes (89 + 97 + 101 + 103 + 107 + 109), admirable number
 607 – prime number, sum of three consecutive primes (197 + 199 + 211), Mertens function(607) = 0, balanced prime, strictly non-palindromic number, Mersenne prime exponent
 608 = 25 × 19, Mertens function(608) = 0, nontotient, happy number, number of regions formed by drawing the line segments connecting any two of the perimeter points of a 3 times 4 grid of squares.
 609 = 3 × 7 × 29, sphenic number, strobogrammatic number

610s
 610 = 2 × 5 × 61, sphenic number, nontotient, Fibonacci number, Markov number. Also a kind of telephone wall socket used in Australia.
 611 = 13 × 47, sum of the three standard board sizes in Go (92 + 132 + 192), the 611th tribonacci number is prime
 612 = 22 × 32 × 17, Harshad number, Zuckerman number , area code for Minneapolis, MN

 613 = prime number, first number of prime triple (p, p + 4, p + 6), middle number of sexy prime triple (p − 6, p, p + 6). Geometrical numbers:  Centered square number with 18 per side, circular number of 21 with a square grid and 27 using a triangular grid.  Also 17-gonal.  Hypotenuse of a right triangle with integral sides, these being 35 and 612.  Partitioning:  613 partitions of 47 into non-factor primes, 613 non-squashing partitions into distinct parts of the number 54.  Squares:  Sum of squares of two consecutive integers, 17 and 18.  Additional properties:  a lucky number, index of prime Lucas number.
 In Judaism the number 613 is very significant, as its metaphysics, the Kabbalah, views every complete entity as divisible into 613 parts:  613 parts of every Sefirah; 613 mitzvot, or divine Commandments in the Torah; 613 parts of the human body.
 The number 613 hangs from the rafters at Madison Square Garden in honor of New York Knicks coach Red Holzman's 613 victories.
 614 = 2 × 307, nontotient, 2-Knödel number. According to Rabbi Emil Fackenheim, the number of Commandments in Judaism should be 614 rather than the traditional 613.
 615 = 3 × 5 × 41, sphenic number

 616 = 23 × 7 × 11, Padovan number, balanced number, an alternative value for the Number of the Beast (more commonly accepted to be 666).
 617 = prime number, sum of five consecutive primes (109 + 113 + 127 + 131 + 137), Chen prime, Eisenstein prime with no imaginary part, number of compositions of 17 into distinct parts, prime index prime, index of prime Lucas number
 Area code 617, a telephone area code covering the metropolitan Boston area.
 618 = 2 × 3 × 103, sphenic number, admirable number.
 619 = prime number, strobogrammatic prime, alternating factorial

620s
 620 = 22 × 5 × 31, sum of four consecutive primes (149 + 151 + 157 + 163), sum of eight consecutive primes (61 + 67 + 71 + 73 + 79 + 83 + 89 + 97). The sum of the first 620 primes is itself prime.
 621 = 33 × 23, Harshad number, the discriminant of a totally real cubic field
 622 = 2 × 311, nontotient, Fine number. Fine's sequence (or Fine numbers): number of relations of valence >= 1 on an n-set; also number of ordered rooted trees with n edges having root of even degree It is also the standard diameter of modern road bicycle wheels (622 mm, from hook bead to hook bead)
 623 = 7 × 89, number of partitions of 23 into an even number of parts
 624 = 24 × 3 × 13 = J4(5), sum of a twin prime (311 + 313), Harshad number, Zuckerman number
 625 = 252 = 54, sum of seven consecutive primes (73 + 79 + 83 + 89 + 97 + 101 + 103), centered octagonal number, 1-automorphic number, Friedman number since 625 = 56−2
 626 = 2 × 313, nontotient, 2-Knödel number. Stitch's experiment number.
 627 = 3 × 11 × 19, sphenic number, number of integer partitions of 20, Smith number
 628 = 22 × 157, nontotient, totient sum for first 45 integers
 629 = 17 × 37, highly cototient number, Harshad number, number of diagonals in a 37-gon

630s
 630 = 2 × 32 × 5 × 7, sum of six consecutive primes (97 + 101 + 103 + 107 + 109 + 113), triangular number, hexagonal number, sparsely totient number, Harshad number, balanced number
 631 = Cuban prime number, centered triangular number, centered hexagonal number, Chen prime, lazy caterer number 
 632 = 23 × 79, refactorable number, number of 13-bead necklaces with 2 colors
 633 = 3 × 211, sum of three consecutive primes (199 + 211 + 223), Blum integer; also, in the title of the movie 633 Squadron
 634 = 2 × 317, nontotient, Smith number
 635 = 5 × 127, sum of nine consecutive primes (53 + 59 + 61 + 67 + 71 + 73 + 79 + 83 + 89), Mertens function(635) = 0, number of compositions of 13 into pairwise relatively prime parts
 "Project 635", the Irtysh River diversion project in China involving a dam and a canal.
 636 = 22 × 3 × 53, sum of ten consecutive primes (43 + 47 + 53 + 59 + 61 + 67 + 71 + 73 + 79 + 83), Smith number, Mertens function(636) = 0
 637 = 72 × 13, Mertens function(637) = 0, decagonal number
 638 = 2 × 11 × 29, sphenic number, sum of four consecutive primes (151 + 157 + 163 + 167), nontotient, centered heptagonal number
 639 = 32 × 71, sum of the first twenty primes, also ISO 639 is the ISO's standard for codes for the representation of languages

640s
 640 = 27 × 5, Harshad number, refactorable number, hexadecagonal number, number of 1's in all partitions of 24 into odd parts, number of acres in a square mile
 641 = prime number, Sophie Germain prime, factor of 4294967297 (the smallest nonprime Fermat number), Chen prime, Eisenstein prime with no imaginary part, Proth prime
 642 = 2 × 3 × 107 = 14 + 24 + 54, sphenic number, admirable number
 643 = prime number, largest prime factor of 123456
 644 = 22 × 7 × 23, nontotient, Perrin number, Harshad number, common umask, admirable number
 645 = 3 × 5 × 43, sphenic number, octagonal number, Smith number, Fermat pseudoprime to base 2, Harshad number
 646 = 2 × 17 × 19, sphenic number, also ISO 646 is the ISO's standard for international 7-bit variants of ASCII, number of permutations of length 7 without rising or falling successions
 647 = prime number, sum of five consecutive primes (113 + 127 + 131 + 137 + 139), Chen prime, Eisenstein prime with no imaginary part, 3647 - 2647 is prime
 648 = 23 × 34 = A331452(7, 1), Harshad number, Achilles number, area of a square with diagonal 36
 649 = 11 × 59, Blum integer

650s
 650 = 2 × 52 × 13, primitive abundant number, square pyramidal number, pronic number, nontotient, totient sum for first 46 integers; (other fields) the number of seats in the House of Commons of the United Kingdom, admirable number
 651 = 3 × 7 × 31, sphenic number, pentagonal number, nonagonal number
 652 = 22 × 163, maximal number of regions by drawing 26 circles
 653 = prime number, Sophie Germain prime, balanced prime, Chen prime, Eisenstein prime with no imaginary part
 654 = 2 × 3 × 109, sphenic number, nontotient, Smith number, admirable number
 655 = 5 × 131, number of toothpicks after 20 stages in a three-dimensional grid
 656 = 24 × 41 = . In Judaism, 656 is the number of times that Jerusalem is mentioned in the Hebrew Bible or Old Testament. 
 657 = 32 × 73, the largest known number not of the form a2+s with s a semiprime
 658 = 2 × 7 × 47, sphenic number, untouchable number
 659 = prime number, Sophie Germain prime, sum of seven consecutive primes (79 + 83 + 89 + 97 + 101 + 103 + 107), Chen prime, Mertens function sets new low of −10 which stands until 661, highly cototient number, Eisenstein prime with no imaginary part, strictly non-palindromic number

660s
 660 = 22 × 3 × 5 × 11
Sum of four consecutive primes (157 + 163 + 167 + 173).
Sum of six consecutive primes (101 + 103 + 107 + 109 + 113 + 127).
Sum of eight consecutive primes (67 + 71 + 73 + 79 + 83 + 89 + 97 + 101).
Sparsely totient number.
Sum of 11th row when writing the natural numbers as a triangle.
Harshad number.
 661 = prime number
Sum of three consecutive primes (211 + 223 + 227).
Mertens function sets new low of −11 which stands until 665. 
Pentagram number of the form . 
Hexagram number of the form  i.e. a star number.
 662 = 2 × 331, nontotient, member of Mian–Chowla sequence
 663 = 3 × 13 × 17, sphenic number, Smith number
 664 = 23 × 83, refactorable number, number of knapsack partitions of 33
Telephone area code for Montserrat.
Area code for Tijuana within Mexico.
Model number for the Amstrad CPC664 home computer.
 665 = 5 × 7 × 19, sphenic number, Mertens function sets new low of −12 which stands until 1105, number of diagonals in a 38-gon
 666 = 2 × 32 × 37, Harshad number, repdigit
 667 = 23 × 29, lazy caterer number 
 668 = 22 × 167, nontotient
 669 = 3 × 223, blum integer

670s
 670 = 2 × 5 × 67, sphenic number, octahedral number, nontotient
 671 = 11 × 61. This number is the magic constant of n×n normal magic square and n-queens problem for n = 11.
 672 = 25 × 3 × 7, harmonic divisor number, Zuckerman number, admirable number
 673 = prime number, Proth prime
 674 = 2 × 337, nontotient, 2-Knödel number
 675 = 33 × 52, Achilles number
 676 = 22 × 132 = 262, palindromic square
 677 = prime number, Chen prime, Eisenstein prime with no imaginary part, number of non-isomorphic self-dual multiset partitions of weight 10
 678 = 2 × 3 × 113, sphenic number, nontotient, number of surface points of an octahedron with side length 13, admirable number
 679 = 7 × 97, sum of three consecutive primes (223 + 227 + 229), sum of nine consecutive primes (59 + 61 + 67 + 71 + 73 + 79 + 83 + 89 + 97), smallest number of multiplicative persistence 5

680s
 680 = 23 × 5 × 17, tetrahedral number, nontotient
 681 = 3 × 227, centered pentagonal number
 682 = 2 × 11 × 31, sphenic number, sum of four consecutive primes (163 + 167 + 173 + 179), sum of ten consecutive primes (47 + 53 + 59 + 61 + 67 + 71 + 73 + 79 + 83 + 89), number of moves to solve the Norwegian puzzle strikketoy.
 683 = prime number, Sophie Germain prime, sum of five consecutive primes (127 + 131 + 137 + 139 + 149), Chen prime, Eisenstein prime with no imaginary part, Wagstaff prime
 684 = 22 × 32 × 19, Harshad number, number of graphical forest partitions of 32
 685 = 5 × 137, centered square number
 686 = 2 × 73, nontotient, number of multigraphs on infinite set of nodes with 7 edges
 687 = 3 × 229, 687 days to orbit the sun (Mars) D-number
 688 = 24 × 43, Friedman number since 688 = 8 × 86, 2-automorphic number
 689 = 13 × 53, sum of three consecutive primes (227 + 229 + 233), sum of seven consecutive primes (83 + 89 + 97 + 101 + 103 + 107 + 109). Strobogrammatic number

690s
 690 = 2 × 3 × 5 × 23, sum of six consecutive primes (103 + 107 + 109 + 113 + 127 + 131), sparsely totient number, Smith number, Harshad number
 ISO 690 is the ISO's standard for bibliographic references
 691 = prime number, (negative) numerator of the Bernoulli number B12 = -691/2730. Ramanujan's tau function τ and the divisor function σ11 are related by the remarkable congruence  τ(n) ≡ σ11(n) (mod 691).
 In number theory, 691 is a "marker" (similar to the radioactive markers in biology): whenever it appears in a computation, one can be sure that Bernoulli numbers are involved.
 692 = 22 × 173, number of partitions of 48 into powers of 2 
 693 = 32 × 7 × 11, triangular matchstick number, the number of sections in Ludwig Wittgenstein's Philosophical Investigations.
 694 = 2 × 347, centered triangular number, nontotient
 695 = 5 × 139, 695!! + 2 is prime.
 696 = 23 × 3 × 29, sum of eight consecutive primes (71 + 73 + 79 + 83 + 89 + 97 + 101 + 103), totient sum for first 47 integers, trails of length 9 on honeycomb lattice 
 697 = 17 × 41, cake number; the number of sides of Colorado
 698 = 2 × 349, nontotient, sum of squares of two primes
 699 = 3 × 233, D-number

References 

Integers